Allder is a surname. People with that name include:
 Danny Alder (AKA Danny Allder, born before 2007), Australian actor
 Doug Allder (born 1951), English professional footballer
 Nick Allder (born 1943), English special effects supervisor and coordinator

See also 
 Allders, an English former department store
 Alda (name)
 Alder (surname)
 Alders (disambiguation)